Louis Joseph Rochelli (January 11, 1919 – October 23, 1992) was a  Major League Baseball second baseman who appeared in five games for the Brooklyn Dodgers in 1944.  The 25-year-old rookie was a native of Staunton, Illinois.

Rochelli is one of many ballplayers who only appeared in the major leagues during World War II. He played in five consecutive games (August 25-August 29) for the Dodgers, four against the New York Giants at the Polo Grounds and one against the Philadelphia Blue Jays at Ebbets Field. He went 3-for-17 (.176) with 2 walks, a triple, and 2 runs batted in. He handled 27 of 28 chances successfully for a .964 fielding percentage.

Rochelli managed in the Dodgers farm system from 1947–1958, primarily with the Great Falls Electrics of the Pioneer League.

He died at the age of 73 in Victoria, Texas.

External links 

Retrosheet

Major League Baseball second basemen
Baseball players from Illinois
Brooklyn Dodgers players
Minor league baseball managers
Valdosta Trojans players
Elizabethton Betsy Red Sox players
Fort Smith Giants players
Grand Rapids Colts players
Durham Bulls players
Montreal Royals players
St. Paul Saints (AA) players
Mobile Bears players
Trois-Rivières Royals players
Valdosta Dodgers players
Danville Dodgers players
Greenwood Dodgers players
Great Falls Electrics players
Victoria Rosebuds players
1919 births
1992 deaths
People from Staunton, Illinois